Scopula flexio is a moth of the family Geometridae. It is endemic to South Africa.

References

Moths described in 1917
Endemic moths of South Africa
flexio
Taxa named by Louis Beethoven Prout